Jonathan Lastra Martínez (born 3 June 1993 in Bilbao) is a Spanish cyclist, who currently rides for UCI WorldTeam . In August 2018, he was named in the startlist for the Vuelta a España, which was his first Grand Tour.

Major results

Road

2013
 1st Road race, Basque Under–23 Road Championships
2016
 10th Coppa Ugo Agostoni
2018
 6th Circuito de Getxo
 9th Overall Tour of Croatia
 10th Grand Prix de Plumelec-Morbihan
2019
 1st Clássica da Arrábida
 5th Overall Vuelta a Castilla y León
 8th GP Miguel Induráin
2021 
 2nd Clássica da Arrábida
 2nd Trofeo Serra de Tramuntana
 4th Overall Volta ao Algarve
 6th Overall Vuelta a Andalucía
 10th Overall Tour of Slovenia
  Combativity award Stage 11 Vuelta a España
2022
 3rd Overall Vuelta a Castilla y León
 4th Overall Troféu Joaquim Agostinho
1st Stage 1
 8th Overall CRO Race
 8th Overall Volta ao Alentejo
 9th Overall Okolo Slovenska
 10th Grand Prix du Morbihan

Grand Tour general classification results timeline

Cyclo-cross
2010–2011
 1st Medina de Pomar Juniors
 2nd National Junior Championships
 3rd Karrantza Juniors
 3rd Villarcayo Juniors
 3rd Asteasu Juniors
2012–2013
 1st  National Under-23 Championships
 2nd Ispasterko Udala Sari Nagusia
2013–2014
 1st  National Under-23 Championships
 3rd Valencia

References

External links

1993 births
Living people
Spanish male cyclists
Cyclo-cross cyclists
Sportspeople from Bilbao
Cyclists from the Basque Country (autonomous community)
21st-century Spanish people